The 1983 Cupa României Final was the 45th final of Romania's most prestigious cup competition. The final was played at the Stadionul 23 August in Bucharest on 6 July 1983 and was contested between Divizia A sides Universitatea Craiova and Politehnica Timişoara. The cup was won by Craiova. They were unable to play in the 1983–84 European Cup Winners' Cup as the closing date for entries was June 30. As a result, both the President and Secretary of the Romanian FA – Andrei Rădulescu and Florin Dumitrescu – were sacked.

Route to the final

Match details

References

External links
 Official site 

Cupa Romaniei Final, 1983
1983
CS Universitatea Craiova matches
FC Politehnica Timișoara matches